Bethania is a hamlet in Ceredigion, mid Wales.

Geography
The centre of this dispersed community in the rural heart of the county is at the junction of the B4577 and B4576 roads.

The bottling plant of the Tŷ Nant bottled water company is nearby.

References 

Villages in Ceredigion
Communities in Ceredigion